Dornix, also known as dornicks and darnacle, is a wool and linen fabric, first used in the 16th century.

Dornix originated in the Belgian town of Tournai (Doornik in Flemish) in the 15th century and was made from a combination of wool and linen. It was a coarse cloth, similar to kersey, and used on beds, hangings, curtains and similar purposes. It was popular in middle-class English homes in the 15th century. Manufacture spread to the Flemish town of Lille, and to Norwich in England, where substantial manufacture continued until the 18th century.

Dornick
Dornick (also spelled dornock Dornec or Darnec) was a strong linen damask used for table cloth, wall hangings, etc. Dornick also originated at Tournai. A similar fabric was Dorrock; the names Dornock and Dorrock are associated with Scotland.

Bibliography

References

Woven fabrics